A number of motor vessels have been named Monte Pascoal, after the mountain in Brazil, including –

 , a Hamburg Süd ocean liner
 , a Hamburg Süd container ship
  (2005), a Hamburg Süd container ship

See also
 Monte Pascoal, a mountain near Porto Seguro, Bahia, Brazil

Ship names